The Seosan Jeong clan is a Korean clans. Their Bon-gwan was in Seosan, South Chungcheong Province. According to the research held in 2000, the number of Seosan Jeong clan was 15362. Their founder was  living in Pujiang County, Zhejiang who was a government officer in Song dynasty.  used to be a Yuanwailang (員外郎/员外郎). Then, he settled in Seosan of Goryeo after Song dynasty declined.

See also 
 Korean clan names of foreign origin

References

External links 
 

 
Korean clan names of Chinese origin
Jeong clans